Ellie Goldstein (born 2002) is a British model with Down syndrome.

Goldstein was born in Ilford, Essex to a Jewish family. She is represented by Zebedee Management and has been modeling since she was 15. She is studying performing arts and has worked on campaigns for Nike, Vodafone, and Superdrug.

In November 2019, Gucci and Vogue Italia scouted Ellie during the Photo Vogue Festival as part of their digital editorial on “Unconventional Beauty. The photo was taken by photographer David PD Hyde.”

Goldstein is the first model with a disability to represent the Gucci brand and model their beauty products.

References 

British female models
People with Down syndrome
Living people
People from Essex
Models with disabilities
2002 births
British Jews